""  is the title of the Kuwaiti national anthem written by poet ʾAḥmad Mishārī al-ʿAdwānī with music composed by ʾIbrāhīm al-Ṣūla and arranged by ʾAḥmad ʿAlī. It was first broadcast on 25 February 1978. Prior to 1978, the "Amiri Salute" was used.

It is available on many public platforms such as YouTube, Spotify, SoundCloud, and Anghami and is also played everyday at the beginning of the day in most Kuwaiti schools.

Although the anthem was chosen during the reign of Sheikh Sabah Al-Salem Al-Sabah, it was not used in his era due to his death on 31 December 1977. As it was scheduled to start using the anthem on the day of the celebration of Kuwait’s National Day, and at that time the mourning period for the former Emir Sheikh Sabah Al-Salem Al-Sabah was completed.

Lyrics

Notes

References

External links
Kuwaiti Embassy in Beirut - The Embassy of the State of Kuwait in Beirut has long and short versions of the National Anthem.
Kuwait: Al-Nasheed Al-Watani - Audio of the national anthem of Kuwait, with information and lyrics (archive link)
BBC News - Instrumental version of "An-Nasheed Al-Watani" in RealAudio

Kuwaiti music
National symbols of Kuwait
Kuwait
National anthem compositions in B-flat major